The canton of Tonneins is an administrative division of the Lot-et-Garonne department, southwestern France. Its borders were modified at the French canton reorganisation which came into effect in March 2015. Its seat is in Tonneins.

It consists of the following communes:
 
Brugnac
Castelmoron-sur-Lot
Clairac
Coulx
Fauillet
Grateloup-Saint-Gayrand
Hautesvignes
Labretonie
Lafitte-sur-Lot
Laparade
Tonneins
Varès
Verteuil-d'Agenais

References

Cantons of Lot-et-Garonne